Ric Estrada  (February 26, 1928 – May 1, 2009) was a Cuban American comics artist who worked for companies including the major American publisher DC Comics. He also worked in comic strips, political cartoons, advertising, storyboarding, and commercial illustration.

Biography

Early life and career
Ric Estrada was born in Havana, Cuba. He made his first professional sale, an illustration used on the cover of the Cuban magazine Bohemia, at the age of 13. Estrada attended the University of Havana. Through his uncle, Sergio Carbo, Estrada met writer Ernest Hemingway; the two men facilitated Estrada's move to New York City in 1947 to further his artistic studies and start a career. Estrada there attended the New York Art Students League, New York University, and the School of Visual Arts. Estrada's first New York home was in Greenwich Village where he met fellow artists such as Lee J. Ames, Dan Barry, Sy Barry, Frank Frazetta, Andre LeBlanc, Mort Meskin, Pete Morisi, Don Perlin, and George Roussos.

Comic books
In the 1950s, Estrada penciled and inked "Bunker", the first comic-book story to feature an African-American hero, and "Rough Riders". Both stories were for the EC Comics series Two-Fisted Tales. He drew for Dell Comics, Hillman Periodicals, St. John Publications, and Ziff-Davis. In the late fifties he drew almost half the satirical articles of the first two issues of the Mad magazine imitator Frantic. After that he moved to Germany, where he stayed for three years. He did political cartoons for the Spandauer Volksblatt in the morning and did storyboards for the advertising company Deutschen Documentar in the afternoons.

In 1967 and 1968, he drew stories for Warren Publishing's black-and-white horror comics magazine Eerie. Much of Estrada's comic book career after returning from Germany was spent working for DC Comics. Though superheroes were not his preference Estrada worked on Superman, Batman, Wonder Woman, Wonder Girl, and Richard Dragon, and he co-created Lady Shiva and Power Girl. Estrada drew detective comics, romance comics, war comics and a few horror stories for DC. In 1976, Estrada's work was in such high demand from DC that he illustrated the premiere issues of six separate titles that year: All Star Comics, Blitzkrieg, Freedom Fighters, Isis, Karate Kid, and Super Friends.

Estrada's preference was for the war stories.  Among the war titles he worked on for DC Comics was G.I. Combat, for which he illustrated a number of stories in the ongoing features "Blitzkrieg" and "Robert Kanigher's Gallery of War", both written by Robert Kanigher.

While working on G.I. Combat #169 (Feb. 1974), Estrada filled a page shortage with an account from the Book of Ether, a short book of scripture contained in the Book of Mormon. That story came to the attention of Hugh W. Pinnock, who was in charge of creating a comic-style adaptation of the New Testament for the Church of Jesus Christ of Latter-day Saints, and in 1980 Estrada drew all the pictures for that book.

Comic strips and animation
Estrada drew the Flash Gordon syndicated newspaper comic strip in sporadic stints from the 1950s to the 1970s.  In the 1980s, he collaborated on the animated television series He-Man and the Masters of the Universe, Galtar, The New Adventures of Jonny Quest, and Bionic Six.

Death
Estrada died May 1, 2009, at 81, after a lengthy battle with prostate cancer.

Awards
Ric Estrada received an Inkpot Award in 2000.

References

External links
 
 Ric Estrada at Mike's Amazing World of Comics

1928 births
2009 deaths
20th-century American artists
20th-century American novelists
20th-century Cuban artists
20th-century Cuban male artists
American comics artists
American comic strip cartoonists
American illustrators
American male novelists
American storyboard artists
Art Students League of New York alumni
Converts to Mormonism
Cuban emigrants to the United States
Cuban Latter Day Saints
DC Comics people
Deaths from prostate cancer
EC Comics
American editorial cartoonists
Inkpot Award winners
Latter Day Saints from New York (state)
New York University alumni
School of Visual Arts alumni
Silver Age comics creators
University of Havana alumni
20th-century American male writers